Hit the Floor may refer to:

 "Hit the Floor" (Twista song), a Twista song
 Hit the Floor (TV series), a VH1 television series debuted in 2013
 Hit the Floor!, a 2005 album by You Say Party
 "Hit the Floor", a song by Bullet for my Valentine from the album The Poison
 "Hit the Floor", a song by Big Ali featuring Dollarman from Big Ali's album Louder
 "Hit the Floor", the fifth song from Linkin Park's second studio album Meteora